Plus is Joseph McElroy's fifth novel.  Set in some unspecified future, it tells the story of Imp Plus, a disembodied brain controlling IMP, the Interplanetary Monitoring Platform, in earth orbit.  The novel consists of Imp Plus's thoughts as he tries to comprehend his limited existence, while struggling with language, limited memories, and communicating with Ground Control.  The plot is driven by Imp Plus's recall of fragments of his past and of language, his improving comprehension of his present, all while his medical condition gradually deteriorates.

McElroy denies that the novel is science fiction, unless "science" is used in its etymological sense of "knowing".

The novel was reprinted as an e-book by Dzanc Books in 2014, with an introductory 2012 poem "A Green of its Own Breathing" by Sarah Grindley, dedicated to "Joe McElroy & Imp Plus".

Sources
McElroy acknowledges three technical sources:

Reception

References

Further reading

Book reviews

Literary analysis
 
 
 
 
 

In addition, see these general works on McElroy's fiction.

1976 American novels
American science fiction novels
Fiction with unreliable narrators
Brain–computer interfacing in fiction
Novels by Joseph McElroy
Alfred A. Knopf books
Postmodern novels